The David and Drusilla Baxter House at 206 W. 1600 N. in Orem, Utah was built in 1895.  It was listed on the National Register of Historic Places in 1998.

According to its NRHP nomination, the house is a "good example of the transitional character of the architecture on the Provo Bench at the latter-part of the 19th century"; it includes Classical and Late Victorian elements.

References

Houses on the National Register of Historic Places in Utah
Victorian architecture in Utah
Houses completed in 1895
Houses in Orem, Utah
National Register of Historic Places in Orem, Utah